György Józsi (born 31 January 1983 in Zalaegerszeg) is a Hungarian football player who currently plays for Ferencvárosi TC.

Career

Győri ETO FC

Honours
Ferencváros
Hungarian League Cup (1): 2012–13

External links
 Profile 
 Gambrinus Liga statistics 

1983 births
Living people
People from Zalaegerszeg
Hungarian footballers
Zalaegerszegi TE players
Nagykanizsai SC footballers
SK Slavia Prague players
Győri ETO FC players
Ferencvárosi TC footballers
Dunaújváros PASE players
Nemzeti Bajnokság I players
Hungarian expatriate footballers
Expatriate footballers in the Czech Republic
Hungarian expatriate sportspeople in the Czech Republic
Association football midfielders
Sportspeople from Zala County